LaGrange County is a county located in the U.S. state of Indiana. As of 2020, the population was 40,446. The county seat is LaGrange, Indiana.

The area is well known for its large Amish population. For that reason, the county teams up with neighboring Elkhart County to promote tourism by referring to the area as Northern Indiana Amish Country.

About half of LaGrange County is Amish, and it is home to the third-largest Amish community in the United States, which belongs to the Elkhart-LaGrange Amish affiliation.

History
The first settlement of LaGrange County was founded about a half mile west of Lima in 1828. Over the next four years, settlers flocked to parts of Lima, Springfield, and Van Buren Townships. Finally in 1832, LaGrange County was carved out of neighboring Elkhart County and established with Lima as the county seat.  The town of LaGrange was platted in 1836 and settled in 1842 as the new county seat, closer to the center of the county.  Lima's name was changed to Howe in 1909.  LaGrange was laid out and platted in 1836.

LaGrange County's initial settlers were Yankee immigrants, that is to say, they were from New England. They were descended from the English Puritans who settled that region in the colonial era.  They were part of a wave of New England settlers moving west into what was then the Northwest Territory after the completion of the Erie Canal.  The original settlers in LaGrange County specifically hailed from the Massachusetts counties of Worcester County, Suffolk County and Berkshire County; the Connecticut counties of Hartford County and Windham County as well as the Connecticut towns of Sherman, Lebanon and Fairfield; and from the Vermont towns of Burlington, Brookfield, Huntington and Grand Isle.  They were mainly members of the Congregational Church, but as a result of the Second Great Awakening, many became Baptists and many also converted to Pentecostalism and Methodism.  When they arrived in LaGrange County, there was nothing but a virgin forest and wild prairie. The New England settlers cleared roads, built farms, constructed churches, erected government buildings, and established post routes.  As a result of this migration, LaGrange County was culturally continuous with early New England culture for many years.

In 1837, the government removed Chief Shipshewana and the Potawatomi Tribe from the county's northwest corner. Several years later, the Chief was allowed to return and died in Newbury Township in 1841.  A town named Georgetown had been platted in 1837 but was abandoned because of lack of development. In 1844, the first Amish came from Pennsylvania to settle around the old town. The village continued to grow, and the town of Shipshewana was platted nearby in 1899 and incorporated in 1916 in Newbury Township.

LaGrange County was named after the Château de la Grange-Bléneau, home of  Revolutionary War hero, the Marquis de la Fayette, outside of Paris, France.

Geography

The county is mostly made up of rural farmland but also some rolling hills and several lakes.

Adjacent counties 
 St. Joseph County, Michigan (northwest)
 Branch County, Michigan (northeast)
 Steuben County (east)
 Noble County (south)
 Elkhart County (west)

Transportation

Major highways

Climate and weather 

Demographics

As of the 2010 United States Census, there were 37,128 people, 11,598 households, and 9,106 families residing in the county. The racial makeup of the county was 96.6% white, 0.3% black or African American, 0.3% Asian, 0.2% American Indian, 1.7% from other races, and 0.8% from two or more races. Those of Hispanic or Latino origin made up 3.5% of the population. In terms of ancestry, 36.1% were German, 13.3% were American, 6.4% were Irish, and 6.4% were English.

Of the 11,598  households, 40.2% had children under the age of 18 living with them, 67.6% were married couples living together, 7.1% had a female householder with no husband present, 21.5% were non-families, and 18.4% of all households were made up of individuals. The average household size was 3.17, and the average family size was 3.66. The median age was 30.4 years.

The median income for a household in the county was $47,697 and the median income for a family was $53,793. Males had a median income of $40,960 versus $29,193 for females. The per capita income for the county was $18,388. About 12.1% of families and 16.0% of the population were below the poverty line, including 23.5% of those under age 18 and 16.6% of those age 65 or over.

Amish community

Approximately 37% of the population of LaGrange County is Amish, as the county is home to the third-largest Amish community in the United States and belongs to the Elkhart-LaGrange Amish affiliation. This is reflected in the linguistic situation in the county: 28.45% of the population report speaking German, Pennsylvania German, or Dutch at home. 68.5% of the total population and 61.29% of the children in 5-17 age group used English as their home language, according to 2000 Census. The Amish languages (German, Pennsylfaansch, and Dutch) were used by 28.47% of the total population and 35.77% of them.

As of 2020 census, Terry Martin, president of the LaGrange County Commissioners, said that "the Amish-English ratio is about 50-50", also adding that the nearly 9% growth, or 3,318 people [between 2010 and 2020 censuses], was mainly due to the increasing Amish population.

Communities

Towns
 LaGrange
 Shipshewana
 Topeka
 Wolcottville (partially in Noble County)

Townships

 Bloomfield
 Clay
 Clearspring
 Eden
 Greenfield
 Johnson
 Lima
 Milford
 Newbury
 Springfield
 Van Buren

Census-designated place
 Howe

Other unincorporated communities

 Brighton
 Brushy Prairie
 Eddy
 Elmira
 Emma
 Gravel Beach
 Greenfield Mills
 Greenwood
 Hartzel
 Honeyville
 Indianola
 Lakeside Park
 Lakeview
 Mongo
 Mount Pisgah
 Northwood
 Oak Lodge
 Ontario
 Pashan
 Plato
 Ramblewood
 River Oaks
 Scott
 Seyberts
 Sha-Get Acres
 Shady Nook
 South Milford
 Star Mill
 Stony Creek
 Stroh
 Tall Timbers
 Timberhurst
 Twin Lakes
 Valentine
 Webers Landing
 Witmer Manor
 Woodland Hills
 Woodland Park
 Woodruff

Economy
The economy is based mainly on agriculture and small shops, but tourism also plays a big role, especially in Shipshewana.

Government
The county is led by a board of three elected commissioners that serve as the county government's executive branch. The county council comprises 7 elected members – four from each council district and 3 at large. Also, one assessor serves the entire county as opposed to one for every township.

The current county commissioners are:
 North District: Terry Martin
 Middle District: Kevin Myers
 South District: Peter Cook
The current county council members are: 
 Charles F. Ashcraft D - District 1
 Ryan Riegsecker R- District 2
 Harold Gingerich R - District 3
 Jim Young R - District 4
 Jeff Brill R - At Large
 Steve McKowen R - At Large
 Mike Strawser R - At Large

LaGrange County is part of Indiana's 3rd congressional district; Indiana Senate district 13; and Indiana House of Representatives districts 18 and 52.

LaGrange County has consistently been a Republican Party stronghold in presidential elections. In only three elections since 1888 has a Republican candidate failed to win the county, most recently in 1964.

Education

The county has three public school districts.

Public schools
The Lakeland Community Schools serve the central part of the county. The system includes Lakeland Primary: Grades (k-2), Lakeland Intermediate: grades (3-6), and Lakeland Jr/Sr High: grades (7-12).

The Prairie Heights School Corporation serves the east side of the county and parts of Steuben County.  The mascot of Prairie Heights School is a black panther.

The Westview School Corporation serves the west portion of the county. This system consists of four elementary schools (Meadowview, Shipshewana-Scott, Topeka, and Westview) and one junior-senior high school named Westview.

Private schools
Several Amish schools are located across the county.

Public library
LaGrange County is served by the La Grange County Public Library, with branches in LaGrange, Shipshewana, and Topeka.

See also
 List of counties in Indiana
 List of counties in Michigan
 Michiana
 National Register of Historic Places listings in LaGrange County, Indiana
 The News Sun, the daily newspaper covering LaGrange County

References

External links
 LaGrange County web site
 LaGrange County Amish Tourism

 
1832 establishments in Indiana
Populated places established in 1832
Amish in Indiana
Indiana counties
Sundown towns in Indiana